Karaoke Angel is the debut studio album by American folk musician Molly Sarlé, released on September 20, 2019 by Partisan Records.

Background
Sarlé originally started recording the album in Durham, North Carolina with Amelia Meath of Sylvan Esso and her producer Sam Evian, however she moved to Dreamland Studios in Woodstock, New York.

Critical reception

Karaoke Angel was met with "generally favorable" reviews from critics. At Metacritic, which assigns a weighted average rating out of 100 to reviews from mainstream publications, this release received an average score of 79, based on 5 reviews.

Amanda Wicks of Pitchfork wrote that "absent the surrounding vocals of Mountain Man, or much instrumental framing beyond guitar, synths, and occasional drums, Sarlé’s voice comes into full frame" and concluded that "on Karaoke Angel, Sarlé wields her voice with power, finding actualization in the act of telling." Vanity Fairs Erin Vanderhoof wrote that the album's songs "buzz with naturalistic sounds, and have a ghostly quality that reflects where they were recorded." Sarah Edwards, writing in Indy Week, described the album as "contemporary and intense and in-step with the metamorphic nature of specific feelings and moments". Tony Inglis of The Skinny described the album as "filled mostly with quiet, vocal-led tracks that veer from haunting, sparse ballads to something more hopeful" and praised "This Close" as the song in which "Sarlé’s intentions seem to all lock into place, bringing together elements that have varied successes individually across the album’s ten songs". In Exclaim!, Allie Gregory argued that "Sarlé's stunning voice" is at the album's center, "and it beats the soul raw while simultaneously supplicating an empathetic ear" and described "Human," "Karaoke Angel" and "Almost Free" as "the album's hardest hitting tracks, covering a range of human emotion: pain, sadness, ecstasy, longing, glee and defeat".

Track listing

Personnel
Credits are adapted from the Karaoke Angel liner notes.

The Band
 Molly Sarlé — vocals, guitar, flute
 Sam Evian — guitar, bass, percussion, Rhodes piano, Prophet, Yamaha VSS, harmonium, Hammond organ
 Brian Betancourt — bass, guitar
 Otto Hauser — drums, percussion

Production and artwork
 Sam Evian — producer; engineer; mixer
 Molly Sarlé — producer; rose photography
 Heba Kadry – mastering engineer
 Kendall Bailey – front jacket; back booklet photography
 Shervin Lainez – back jacket photography
 Ryan McCardle – design; layout

References

External links

2019 debut albums
Partisan Records albums